New  is a 2004 Indian Tamil-language science fiction comedy film directed, written and produced by S. J. Suryah, who also stars alongside Simran. Kiran Rathod and Devayani play supporting roles, It is about an 8-year-old boy who is turned into a 28-year-old man by a scientist.

New was simultaneously shot in Telugu as Naani with Mahesh Babu and Ameesha Patel. The film plot is adapted from the 1988 American film Big.

Plot 

Pappu is a mischievous eight-year-old boy who always troubles his mother Indira. He frequently gets scoldings due to his bed-wetting habit despite being an eight-year-old. Pappu's elder brother Kishore plans to watch a porn movie with his friends in his room, to which he insists on joining them. When Kishore refuses and gets rid of him, Pappu cuts off the power out of anger, creating a short circuit at home. Indira scolds Pappu for his dangerous mischief and shouts at her husband for not stopping with one child. Distraught, Pappu runs away from home to end his life near a river, but is stopped by a man who takes him to his place. The man introduces himself as a scientist who has his own laboratory. He insists Pappu to take a medicine invented by him which will transform a boy to a fully-grown man. Pappu agrees, and the scientist transforms him into a young man. Pappu starts to live as a young man physically, but he is childlike psychologically. The only person other than the scientist who knows the truth is his child classmate friend Deepak.

Now an adult, Pappu goes for an interview in a toy manufacturing company under the name of Vichu. The owner interviewing him demands that he empathize children to understand their taste. Since Vichu is a child, he grabs the job easily. Vichu is diverted to the daughter of the owner, Priya, whom Vichu helped her to her feet at an amusement park before. She is surprised and happy to see him in her company, and love blossoms between them. The Priya-Vichu intimacy creates a jealousy for Raj, another employee in the company who intends to woo her and humiliate Vichu. Vichu meets Kishore as an anonymous man and learns that his mother is very depressed and sick following her son's disappearance. She laments for being so strict with him. Vichu realizes his mother's love and goes to the scientist to revert him back to Pappu. The scientist transforms Vichu into Pappu, and he reconciles with his mother. But again at night, he changes back to Vichu, and he immediately rushes to the scientist who does not know what had gone wrong and both of them are shocked at the mishap.

Pappu now lives as an eight-year-old boy during daytime and as a 28-year-old Vichu during the night. Priya expresses her love to him. Vichu tells her to love a man suitable for her age, but reciprocates his love upon the scientist's coercion. One day, Priya tells him to accompany for a matinee show, to which he rejects due to his transformation mishap. Pappu's mother befriends Priya as they are neighbors, and Priya likes the boy Pappu. Priya is angered by Vichu's absence. She angrily hits Vichu and finally decides to marry him. Raj kidnaps Vichu on the day of marriage, but he changes to Pappu during the daytime. The kidnappers release him as they misunderstand of kidnapping a child. Pappu transforms to Vichu and marries Priya at evening time (Hindu marriages are usually held in the morning). Pappu somehow manages his mother by disappearing during nights. Priya longs for a child, so they have sex which results in Priya being pregnant. Vichu/Pappu meets his mother and understands the difficulties of pregnancy, prompting him to take care of his wife with full affection. Deepak demands to buy ice cream but Vichu refuses as has got a tight schedule as a son, employee, and husband. Deepak gets angry, fights with and reveals the truth to Priya that Vichu is Pappu and she is shocked to hear that she is bearing the child of a child. Priya argues with Pappu for ruining her life and making her pregnant, during which he transforms to Vichu in front of her eyes. Vichu blames her for all this and reveals that he started to love her when she got pregnant and he saw his mother in her. Priya now gets into labor pains, and Vichu takes her to the hospital. But on the way, Vichu is stopped by Raj and his men seeking revenge. Vichu fights them and admits her in a hospital. Everybody now learns the truth about Pappu, and Priya gives birth to Pappu's son and she is upset on her fate of being a child's wife.

20 years pass by. Now Pappu is a real young man of 28 years old. He still lives with Priya as her husband. He goes inside his room as a young man and comes out as the 48-year-old Vichu who is now a husband of a 40-old Priya and father of a 20-year-old son who looks like him. Vichu calls the scientist to find if he had found the remedy for his transformation, which he negates.

Cast

Production 
Suryah began pre-production work on a third story titled New in early 2001, which he would also produce. Starring Ajith Kumar and Jyothika, composer Deva had composed ten songs for the film by June 2001. After Ajith Kumar had become busy with other commitments, Suryah decided to enact the lead role himself, revealing he had always wanted to be an actor. Simran signed on to play the leading female character, while Kiran and Devayani were cast in pivotal roles. A simultaneously shot Telugu version titled Naani featuring Mahesh Babu in the lead role, with Ameesha Patel, Ramya Krishnan and Devayani in supporting roles was also made. Suryah noted that he was loosely inspired by the American film Big (1988). The film was shot in hundred days, with Suryah revealing he would often stop acting in between the scenes, when he knew that his performance was not up to his expectation as a director. Suryah noted that script-writing began in 2001, while production with the final cast began in 2002.

Music 
The soundtrack was composed by A. R. Rahman. In an interview in 2001, Surya earlier stated that Deva had composed ten songs for the film, but he was later replaced by Rahman. The song "Thottal Poo Malarum" reuses lyrics from the song of the same name from Padagotti (1964) but the tune is completely new.

Reception 
Malathi Rangarajan from The Hindu claimed that "belonging to a genre that is rare to our cinema, "New" however, gets bogged down in a mire of duets and double entenders", but hinted at potential success citing that director "seems to have hit the bull's eye." Visual Dasan of Kalki gave a negative review, criticising Suryah for ruining Big by adding vulgarity on the pretext of mother sentiment, while stating that Penny Marshall, the director of Big, would cry like M. R. Radha by seeing this adaptation. The film grossed 18 crore from 120 screens on Day 1.

Controversies 
The film's adult theme generated controversy, and post-release, women activists in the state of Tamil Nadu demanded a ban on a film after release, which they say contained obscene scenes. Suryah responded by claiming that the scenes are there because the storyline requires them and described his film as "fiction laced with adult comedy".

In August 2005, the Madras High Court revoked the film's censor certificate and directed the Chennai Commissioner of Police to investigate two criminal complaints registered against Suryah. They ruled that the film did not provide a "clean and healthy entertainment" and that it would be failing in its duty if it did not revoke the censor certificate, claiming it originally attained an "A" certificate "under questionable circumstances". Suryah was arrested by city police on 22 August 2005 in connection for allegedly throwing a mobile phone at a woman censor board official in a fit of anger during the post-production of the film. According to the complaint, Vanathy Srinivasan, Suryah was denied permission to add the "Kumbakonam" song to the film due to excessively obscene scenes and as a result he allegedly threw a mobile phone at her. He was late released without charge. A fresh case was launched in March 2006, with the Censor Board filing a complaint against Suryah for using stills from scenes that were deleted from the film, with a poster which showed Suryah resting on Simran's cleavage resurfacing. He was subsequently arrested for the second time before being released.

References

External links 
 

2004 multilingual films
2000s Tamil-language films
2004 films
Films directed by S. J. Suryah
Films scored by A. R. Rahman
Indian multilingual films
Indian pregnancy films
Indian science fiction comedy films
Indian sex comedy films
Tamil films remade in other languages
Indian science fiction films